Goodingia varicosa is a species of sea snail, a marine gastropod mollusk in the family Eulimidae. This species, along with Goodingia capillastericola, belongs in the genus Goodingia.

Description
This marine species occurs off Papua New Guinea.

Description
" The length of the shell measures 4 mm, its width between 2½  and 2¾ mm. The small, white shell has an oval shape and is imperforate. It is rather smooth, with very fine growth-striae and a few riblike varices on the body whorl. The whorls number about 6, of which the two apical ones are mucronate, the other whorls are convex with a deep marginate suture. The aperture is subovate. Its upper angle is moderately acute. The right margin is thin, slightly expanded, regularly flexuous, stronger so near the upper part. The columellar side is slightly arched, a little thickened near the base, with a thin layer of enamel on the body whorl. The operculum is thin and horny.

The species vary slightly in shape, some specimens being more swollen than others, which may depend on sex. The varixlike striae on the last whorl are remarkable,"

References

External links
 To World Register of Marine Species

Eulimidae
Gastropods described in 1909